Danco Island or Isla Dedo is an island off Antarctica,  long lying in the southern part of Errera Channel, off the west coast of Graham Land. It was charted by the Belgian Antarctic Expedition under Adrien de Gerlache, 1897–1899.

Station O
Danco Island was the location of the British research Station O. It was active from 26 February, 1956 to 22 February, 1959 with the intention of searching in the survey and geology. The main hut was named Arendal and was demolished and removed by British Antarctic Survey in April 2004.

See also
 List of Antarctic and sub-Antarctic islands
 List of Antarctic research stations
 List of Antarctic field camps
 Crime in Antarctica

References 

 
 peakbagger

Islands of Graham Land
Danco Coast